There are about 4,000 positions in the Executive Office of the President of the United States. The core White House staff positions and most Executive Office positions are generally not required to be confirmed by the Senate. The positions that require Senate confirmation include: the director of the Office of Management and Budget, the chair and members of the Council of Economic Advisers, and the United States trade representative.

, according to tracking by The Washington Post and Partnership for Public Service, of the positions that require Senate confirmation, 16 nominees have been confirmed, and 9 positions currently do not have nominees.

Color key 
 Denotes appointees awaiting Senate confirmation.

 Denotes appointees serving in an acting capacity.

 Denotes appointees who have left office or offices which have been disbanded.

Appointments

White House Office

Office of Domestic Climate Policy

President's Council of Advisors on Science and Technology

President's Intelligence Advisory Board

Office of National Drug Control Policy

Office of Science and Technology Policy

Council on Environmental Quality

Office of the United States Trade Representative

Office of Management and Budget

Council of Economic Advisors

White House COVID-19 Response Team

White House Gender Policy Council

White House Office of Faith-Based and Neighborhood Partnerships

White House Environmental Justice Advisory Council

Withdrawn nominations

See also 
 Joe Biden Supreme Court candidates 
 Cabinet of Joe Biden, for the vetting process undergone by top-level roles including advice and consent by the Senate
 Sr. Advisor to the President, the role formerly held by Karl Rove under George W. Bush, then by Valerie Jarrett/David Axelrod/etc. under Barack Obama
 List of executive branch 'czars' e.g. Special Advisor to the President
 List of federal judges appointed by Joe Biden

References

 
2020s politics-related lists
Lists of political office-holders in the United States
21st-century American politicians
 
Joe Biden-related lists